The Rietburg chairlift is a chair lift that runs from the village of Rhodt in the Palatinate region of Germany to the ruins of the medieval castle of Rietburg. The chairlift is the county of Südliche Weinstraße in the state of Rhineland-Palatinate.

Geography 
The top station of the Rietburg lift is located a few metres north of the Rietburg. Built into the castle ruins is a pub, the Höhengaststätte Rietburg; in the vicinity is a deer enclosure, in which fallow deer are the largest species kept. The route to the chairlift from the major nearby transport routes, the A 65 motorway and B 38 federal road, runs through the little town of Edenkoben.

References

External links 
 Rietburg chairlift website
 Website of Rhodt unter Rietburg: Die Rietburg, links to the Höhengaststätte und Rietburgbahn

Buildings and structures completed in the 20th century
Aerial lifts in Germany
Palatinate Forest
Buildings and structures in Südliche Weinstraße